Johann Lange may refer to:

Johann Joachim Lange (1670–1744), German theologian
Johann Peter Lange (1802–1884), German theologian
Johann de Lange (born 1959), South African writer

See also
Johan Lange (1818–1898), Danish botanist
Johann Lang, or John Lange, friend of Martin Luther
John Lange (disambiguation)